Laura Rutledge (née McKeeman; born October 2, 1988) is a reporter and host for ESPN and the SEC Network. She is an American beauty pageant titleholder from St. Petersburg, Florida, who was named Miss Florida 2012.

Biography
She won the title of Miss Florida on July 7, 2012, when she received her crown from outgoing titleholder Kristina Janolo. Her competition talent was ballet. Rutledge is a graduate of the University of Florida, having majored in broadcast journalism. She was also a member of the Zeta Tau Alpha sorority. She is currently working for ESPN and is featured in multiple shows, including the SEC Network's college football pre-game show, “SEC Nation” and “NFL Live”.

Sports journalist
Rutledge worked for Fox Sports as a sideline reporter, previously covering Fox broadcasts of Tampa Bay Rays games and then San Diego Padres games. She also provided on-field reporting for the Fox College Sports coverage of the NCPA's 2012 National Paintball Championship in Lakeland, Florida. She joined ESPN and the SEC Network in summer 2014.

In 2014, Rutledge hosted the Coors Light PostGame show on Fox College Football and hosted halftime programming for FSN college football games.

Rutledge also hosted "Chargers Insider" for the San Diego Chargers in 2013 and "SD Live."  She is the producer and host of SDLive, an original show she started at Fox Sports San Diego.

On May 16, 2017 she was named host of "SEC Nation" on the SEC Network. On August 17, 2020, she became the host of ESPN's premier NFL show, "NFL Live."

Personal life
She attended Celebration High School in Celebration, Florida. She married Josh Rutledge, a professional baseball player, in 2013. They reside in Birmingham, Alabama. On October 2, 2019, Rutledge gave birth to a daughter, Reese Katherine Rutledge.

References

External links

Bio at ESPN's MediaZone

1988 births
Living people
American beauty pageant winners
American women journalists
CNN people
College football announcers
College basketball announcers in the United States
ESPN people
Major League Baseball broadcasters
Miss America 2013 delegates
People from St. Petersburg, Florida
Tampa Bay Rays announcers
University of Florida College of Journalism and Communications alumni
21st-century American journalists